Hungry Hills is a 2009 Canadian Western drama film starring Keir Gilchrist, Alexander De Jorday, Alexia Fast, John Pyper-Ferguson and Gabrielle Rose.  It is based on the novel of the same name by George Ryga.

Plot

Cast
Keir Gilchrist as Snit Mandolin
Alexander De Jordy as Johnny Swift
John Pyper-Ferguson as Ray Kane
Gabrielle Rose as Aunt Matilda
Alexia Fast as Robin
Cavan Cunningham as Lewis Whittles
Graham Chabot as Donny
Leo Fafard as Bootlegger

References

External links
 

Canadian drama films
English-language Canadian films
Films based on Canadian novels
2000s English-language films
Films directed by Rob W. King
2000s Canadian films